Stylidens is an extinct genus of mammaliaforms, possibly belonging to Morganucodonta, that lived in what is now England during the Middle Jurassic. Its type species is Stylidens hookeri, which was named in 2016 by Percy M. Butler and Denise Sigogneau-Russell from an isolated lower molar found at the Forest Marble Formation. A second molar referable to the genus is also known, which may represent a separate species.

Etymology
The specific name hookeri honours the British researcher Jerry Hooker.

References

Morganucodonts
Prehistoric cynodont genera
Jurassic synapsids of Europe
Bathonian life
Jurassic England
Fossils of England
Fossil taxa described in 2016
Taxa named by Percy M. Butler
Taxa named by Denise Sigogneau‐Russell